is a Japanese swimmer. He competed in the men's 200 metre butterfly event at the 2018 Asian Games, winning the silver medal.

References

External links
 

1999 births
Living people
Japanese male butterfly swimmers
Place of birth missing (living people)
Asian Games medalists in swimming
Asian Games silver medalists for Japan
Swimmers at the 2018 Asian Games
Medalists at the 2018 Asian Games
Universiade medalists in swimming
Universiade gold medalists for Japan
Medalists at the 2017 Summer Universiade
Medalists at the 2019 Summer Universiade
21st-century Japanese people